The 1971–72 Lancashire Cup was the fifty-ninth occasion on which the completion had been held. Wigan won the trophy by beating Widnes by the score of 15-8 in the final. The match was played at Knowsley Road, Eccleston, St Helens, (historically in the county of Lancashire). The attendance was 6,970 and receipts were £2,204.00 (the first final after the UK went decimal)

Background 

The total number of teams entering the competition decreased by two down to a total of 14, due to no junior/amateur clubs taking part.
The same fixture format was retained, but due to the decrease in the number of participating clubs, resulted in one  “blank” or “dummy” fixtures in the first round, and one bye in the second round.

Competition and results

Round 1 
Involved  7 matches (with one “blank” fixture) and 14 clubs

Round 2 - Quarter-finals 
Involved 3 matches (with one bye) and 7 clubs

Round 3 – Semi-finals  
Involved 2 matches and 4 clubs

Final

Teams and scorers 

Scoring - Try = three (3) points - Goal = two (2) points - Drop goal = two (2) points

The road to success

Notes and comments 
1 * Knowsley Road was the home ground of St. Helens from 1890 to 2010. The final capacity was in the region of 18,000, although the actual record attendance was 35,695 set on December 26, 1949, for a league game between St Helens and Wigan

See also 
British rugby league system
1971–72 Northern Rugby Football League season
Rugby league county cups
List of defunct rugby league clubs

References

External links
Saints Heritage Society
1896–97 Northern Rugby Football Union season at wigan.rlfans.com
Hull&Proud Fixtures & Results 1896/1897
Widnes Vikings - One team, one passion Season In Review - 1896-97
The Northern Union at warringtonwolves.org

RFL Lancashire Cup
Lancashire Cup